Brillo is a trade name for a scouring pad, used for cleaning dishes, and made from steel wool impregnated with soap. The concept was patented in 1913, at a time when aluminium pots and pans were replacing cast iron in the kitchen; the new cookware blackened easily. The company's website states the name Brillo is from the Latin word for "bright", although no such word exists in Latin. In Spanish the word brillo means the noun "shine";  however, German, Italian, French, and English do have words for "shine" or "bright" beginning with brill- deriving from Latin words for beryl.

History
In the early 1900s, in New York, an unnamed cookware peddler and his brother-in-law, an unnamed jeweller, were working on a solution to clean blackened cookware. Using jewellers' rouge, with soap and fine steel wool from Germany, they developed a method to scour the backsides of cooking utensils when they began to blacken. The method worked and the peddler added this new product, soap with steel wool, into his line of goods for sale.

Demand for the steel wool, copper spun and soap with jewellers' rouge increased quickly. The peddler and the jeweller decided to patent the product. Because they lacked the money to pay for legal services, they offered New York attorney Milton Loeb an interest in their business. Loeb accepted and in 1913, he secured a patent for the product under the name Brillo.  The partnership formed between the peddler, the jeweller and the attorney became known as the Brillo Manufacturing Company, with headquarters and production operations in New York City.

By 1917, the company was selling packaged boxes of six pads, with a cake of soap included. During World War I, it helped with needed efforts of field operations.  In 1921, the company moved its production facility to London, Ohio. It was only in the 1930s that soap was contained within the pad. 

The company merged with Purex Industries in 1962. The Dial Corporation acquired Purex Industries in 1985. Church and Dwight acquired the Brillo business from Dial in 1997.

In 2010, Armaly Brands of Walled Lake, Michigan, primarily a manufacturer of sponges, purchased the Brillo business from Church & Dwight. At that time there were about 50 employees, down from a high of about 150 in the 1990s.

Production
Brillo is manufactured in London, Ohio.

Brillo Basics
In December 2019, Innovative Brands, a division of International Wholesale, agreed to a licensing agreement with Armaly Brands to launch Brillo Basics, a line of household cleaning products.

In art
The most famous example of Brillo in pop art is works by Andy Warhol in 1964. Warhol did artwork on boxes with the 60's Brillo logo.

See also 
 S.O.S Soap Pad

References

External links
 Brillo
 Brillo Basics

Cleaning products
Products introduced in 1913